Oscar da Silva (20 June 1920 – 7 February 2010) was a Brazilian equestrian. He competed in two events at the 1960 Summer Olympics.

References

External links
 

1920 births
2010 deaths
Brazilian male equestrians
Olympic equestrians of Brazil
Equestrians at the 1960 Summer Olympics
People from Garanhuns
Sportspeople from Pernambuco